Mahikari is a Japanese new religious movement (shinshūkyō) that was founded in 1959 by Yoshikazu Okada (岡田 良一) (1901–1974). The word "Mahikari" means "True (真, ma) Light (光, hikari)" in Japanese.

Foundation
The Mahikari organization was founded by Kōtama Okada (born, Yoshikazu Okada) in 1959 under the name L. H. Yokoshi no Tomo (陽光子友乃会, Yokoshi Tomo no Kai, "Lucky, Healthy, Association of Bright / Positive People").

Beliefs
Kōtama Okada claimed that his role involved spreading God's Light and the universal principles to humanity.

The art of True Light is a practice meant to purify one's spiritual aspect as an expedient toward attaining happiness. Radiating Light from the palm of the hand is a method of purification that cleanses the spirit, mind and body, and is said to help open the way to resolving all manner of problems. Okada spent much of his time in the early days of the organization giving Light to people throughout Japan. In 1973, he visited Europe, and the art of True Light started spreading throughout the world.

Kōtama Okada believed that if people lived in accordance with "universal principles," they would cultivate their spirituality, and naturally come to use science and technology that was integrated with an understanding of spirituality, to find solutions to pressing issues facing humanity. Mahikari encourages people to incorporate these universal or divine principles in their daily life by practicing virtues such as altruistic love, gratitude, humility and acceptance of the will of God. Kōtama Okada proclaimed the fundamental tenet of the organization, "The origin of the earth is one, the origin of the universe is one, the origin of humankind is one, and the origin of all religions is one." He emphasized that all human beings share a common origin and that people should work together to create a peaceful world of love and harmony, transcending the barriers of religious denomination, nationality, ideology, and so on.

Okada claimed that God has a plan ("the divine plan"), and in preparation for a heaven-like civilization on earth, the world was entering a time of great upheaval. Okada said that an increase in what he called the spiritual energy of fire would result in abnormal weather phenomena such as flooding, fires, and water shortages, and encouraged people to transition from a way of life based on excessive materialism to a sustainable way of life in harmony with the environment and universal principles.

The fundamental teachings of Mahikari appear in The Holy Words (Goseigen) and The Yōkōshi Prayer Book (Yōkōshi Norigotoshū).

Mahikari organizations
Following the passing of Kōtama Okada on June 13, 1974, a number of Mahikari-related organization have come into existence.

 1963 : "Sekai Mahikari Bunmei Kyodan" – The name when the organization was first registered as a religious entity. In 1974, Sakae Sekiguchi assumed the leadership of this organization with around 1/4 of the original members. 
 1978 : "Sukyo Mahikari" , was registered by Keishu Okada, the daughter of the founder, after an amicable settlement following the passing of the founder. Around 3/4 of the original membership followed. 
 Other organizations with relatively minor membership that stem from Mahikari include Yokoshi Tomo no Kai, Seiho no Kai, Subikari, Shin-Yu-Gen Kyusei Mahikari, and so on.

Organizations with similarities

Other religious organizations that have similarities include Oomoto, Sekai Kyūsei Kyō, Tenrikyo, and Konkokyo. In Sekai Kyūsei Kyō, a practice called Jorei (purification of the spirit) is undertaken. A number of organizations have practices that channel universal energy but it is noted that the emphasis in Mahikari is radiating Light from a high dimension emanated from the Creator God. This Light is said to purify the spirit, mind, and body, of human beings and is made possible through a divine pendant called Omitama.

See also
 Japanese new religions
 New religious movement
 Religions of Japan

Notes

References

External links
 Sukyo Mahikari Sul America (em português)
 Sekai Mahikari Bunmei Kyodan
 Yokoshi Tomo No Kai
 Sukyo Mahikari Japan
 Sukyo Mahikari North America
 Sukyo Mahikari Europe and Africa
 Sukyo Mahikari Australia-Oceania
 Sukyo Mahikari India

Religious organizations based in Japan
Religious organizations established in 1959
Japanese new religions